2nd Fominovka is a rural locality (a village) in Mikhaylovskoye Rural Settlement of Kormilovsky District, Russia. The population was 374 as of 2010.

Geography 
2nd Fominovka is located 30 km southeast of Kormilovka (the district's administrative centre) by road. 1st Fominovka is the nearest rural locality.

Streets 
 60 let Oktyabrya
 Molodezhnaya
 Truda

References

External links 
 2nd Fominovka on komandirovka.ru

Rural localities in Omsk Oblast